Déjame Entrar may refer to:

Déjame Entrar (album), an album by Colombian singer/composer Carlos Vives
"Déjame Entrar" (Carlos Vives song)
"Déjame Entrar" (Maná song), a song by Maná from the 1995 album Cuando los Ángeles Lloran
"Déjame Entrar" (Makano song)
Déjame Entrar, the Spanish name of Let the Right One In (film), a Swedish horror film